William Charles Cox (born 27 November 1901 – 1978) was a footballer who played as a left back, centre half or left half for Southend United and West Ham United in the English Football League. He also played for Glico Works and Ilford.

References

1900s births
1978 deaths
Footballers from West Ham
Ilford F.C. players
Southend United F.C. players
West Ham United F.C. players
English Football League players
English footballers
Association football defenders